Mannasseh, also transliterated as Mannasses, was a Jewish High Priest (c. 245-240 BC) during the Second Temple period. He was the son of Jaddua and brother of Onias I.

He was succeeded by his nephew's son Onias II.

Patrilineal Ancestry

Abraham
Isaac
Jacob
Levi
Kohath
Amram
Aaron
Eleazar
Phinehas
Abishua
Bukki
Uzzi
Zerahiah
Meraioth
Amariah
Ahitub
Zadok
Ahimaaz
Azariah
Johanan
Azariah
Amariah
Ahitub
Zadok II
Shallum
Hilkiah
Azariah
Seraiah
Jehozadak
Joshua the High Priest
Joiakim
Eliashib
Joiada
Johanan
Jaddua

See also
List of High Priests of Israel

References

3rd-century BCE High Priests of Israel